National Taiwan University Hospital is a metro station in Taipei, Taiwan served by Taipei Metro.

Station overview

The station is a two-level, underground station with an island platform. It has four exits, two of which are equipped with elevators. It is named for the nearby National Taiwan University Hospital. The station has exits to National Taiwan University Hospital, National Taiwan Museum and 228 Peace Memorial Park.

Public art
Several pieces of public art are located on the platform, titled "The Suite of Hands" consisting of "Lotus Holding Hand", "Lotus in Heartful Hands", and "Small Park". These bronze and/or granite sculptures depict how hands, through gestures, can express human affection.

History
This station was opened for service on 24 December 1998.

On 10 October 2004, after the Madrid bombings, a man placed a bomb in the station. No injuries were reported.

Station layout

First and Last Train Timing 
The first and last train timing at NTU Hospital station  is as follows:

Around the station
 Museum of Medical Humanities

References

Railway stations opened in 1998
Tamsui–Xinyi line stations
Hospital Station